"Layla" is a 1971 song by Derek and the Dominos.

Layla may also refer to:
 Layla (name), includes a list of people named Layla
 Layla (town), a town in Saudi Arabia
 Layla (wrestler) (born 1977), a former professional wrestler signed to the WWE
 Layla (video game), a 1986 video game for the Family Computer
 Layla (magazine), a magazine in Iraq
 "Layla" (DJ Robin & Schürze song), 2022 German song
 Layla (Winx Club), a character in Winx Club
 MC Layla, Australian rapper
 Layla bint Mahdi, Arab woman, known through the love story of Layla and Majnun

See also
 Lailah (angel), angel in Jewish mythology
 Laila (disambiguation)
 Leela (disambiguation)
 Leila (disambiguation)
 Lelia (disambiguation)
 Lila (disambiguation)
 Layla and Majnun (disambiguation)